The Neighbors was an American gag-a-day comic strip, created by George Clark, which ran from April 24, 1939, to 1976.

Clark launched The Neighbors in 1939 with the Chicago Tribune-New York Daily News Syndicate. Similar to his earlier Side Glances (1928-1939), it explored subtle aspects of middle-class family humor. He soon added a Sunday strip, Our Neighbors, the Ripples, a title eventually shortened to The Ripples (1939-1948). The Sunday strip was dropped in 1948, but his daily panel continued until 1976.

Stephen Becker (Comic Art in America) commented, "He has never attempted to induce the belly laugh; he feels that a gently humorous reminder of something that has probably happened to his reader will suffice."

Awards
Clark received the National Cartoonists Society's Newspaper Panel Cartoon Award in 1961.

References

External links
 National Cartoonists Society Awards

1939 comics debuts
1971 comics endings
American comic strips
American comics characters
Gag-a-day comics
Gag cartoon comics